Beyzanur Türkyılmaz (born 29 August 2001) is a Turkish handballer, who plays in the Turkish Women's Handball Super League for Konyaaltı Belediyesi SK, and the Turkey national beach handball team.
She plays in the left wing position.

Club career
Türkyılmaz started her handball playing career at her hometown club Eskişehir Hentbol SK playing in the Turkish Women's Handball Super League at age 15.

She played for Muratpaşa Bld. SK, before she transferred to Konyaaltı BSK in the same city by June 2021.

International career
In 2016, she was call up to the Turkey women's national under-17 handball team.

References

External links
Beyzanur Türkyılmaz @Turkey Handball Federation website  
Beyzanur Türkyılmaz @EHF Competition Archive

2001 births
Living people
Sportspeople from Eskişehir
Turkish female handball players
Turkey women's national handball players
Turkish beach handball players
Muratpaşa Bld. SK (women's handball) players
21st-century Turkish women